Arthur Osborn may refer to:
 Arthur Osborn (murderer)
 Arthur Osborn (botanist)

See also
 Arthur Osborne (disambiguation)